Nadav Henefeld (Hebrew: נדב הנפלד; born June 19, 1968) is an Israeli former professional basketball player. During his playing career, he was a 2.00 m (6'6 ") tall power forward.

Early career
Henefeld was born in Ramat Hasharon, Israel, and he initially played pro basketball in his home country, for two seasons (1987–88, and 1988–89).

He won a gold medal with Team Israel, and was voted MVP of the basketball competition, at the 1989 Maccabiah Games.

College career
Henefeld joined the University of Connecticut, and played with the Connecticut Huskies, in the 1989–90 "Dream Season", where he was selected as the Big East Conference Rookie of the Year, and set an all-time NCAA Division I freshman record, with 138 steals.

Professional career
Henefeld returned to Israel for the 1990–91 season, and played with Maccabi Tel Aviv for 12 years, until his retirement from basketball. During that time, he helped his team reach the EuroLeague Final Four on four occasions, in 1991, 2000, 2001 (FIBA SuproLeague), and 2002, winning the FIBA SuproLeague trophy in 2001.

National team career
Henefeld was a regular member of the senior Israeli national team.

References

External links 
FIBA Europe Profile
Euroleague.net Profile

1968 births
Living people
Competitors at the 1989 Maccabiah Games
Hapoel Galil Elyon players
Israeli Basketball Premier League players
Israeli expatriate basketball people in the United States
Israeli Jews
Israeli men's basketball players
Jewish men's basketball players
Maccabi Tel Aviv B.C. players
Maccabiah Games basketball players of Israel
Maccabiah Games gold medalists for Israel
Power forwards (basketball)
UConn Huskies men's basketball players